Stony Brook is a  river located in southern New Hampshire in the United States. It is a tributary of the Souhegan River, which flows to the Merrimack River and ultimately to the Gulf of Maine.

Stony Brook rises in the town of Lyndeborough, New Hampshire, in a valley between Lyndeborough Mountain to the north and Winn Mountain to the south. It flows west into the town of Greenfield, then turns southeast and reenters Lyndeborough, continuing to the Souhegan in the mill town of Wilton.

It is paralleled from Greenfield to Wilton by New Hampshire Route 31 and by the former Hillsboro Branch of the Boston and Maine Railroad.

See also

List of rivers of New Hampshire

References

Tributaries of the Merrimack River
Rivers of New Hampshire
Rivers of Hillsborough County, New Hampshire